"Red Velvet" is a song written by Ian Tyson and recorded by Johnny Cash. While the Cash version is the best known, it was first recorded by Ian & Sylvia Tyson in 1965 on their album Early Morning Rain.

Recorded by Cash at the Columbia Studios in Nashville, Tennessee, the song was released in September 1967 as a single (Columbia 4-44288, with "The Wind Changes" on the opposite side).

U.S. Billboard gave the song a "Country Spotlight" review, stating: "Folkster Ian Tyson's plaintive ballad serves as potent material for Cash as he performs it in his compelling and winning style. Another big Cash hit," but in the end, "Red Velvet" did not chart at all, while the flip side charted on the Billboard country chart, but made it only to number 60 and dropped off completely after only six weeks.

Later the song was included on Johnny Cash's album Old Golden Throat (1968).

Analysis

Other Versions 
 Gordon Lightfoot included it on a 1998 album, A Painter Passing Through.
 Tom Russell includes the song in his tribute album to Ian & Sylvia, Play One More - The Songs of Ian & Sylvia, 2017.

Track listing

References

External links 
 "Red Velvet" on the Johnny Cash official website

Johnny Cash songs
1967 songs
1967 singles
Columbia Records singles
Songs written by Ian Tyson
American country music songs
Song recordings produced by Don Law